Doroshenkoa is a monotypic genus of crickets in tribe Gryllini; the species is recorded from Cambodia.

Taxonomy
The genus contains the following species:
Doroshenkoa cambodiensis Gorochov, 2004

References

Gryllinae
Orthoptera genera